Merriam Peak, at  is one of the peaks of the White Cloud Mountains of Custer County, Idaho.  It was named for John H. Merriam who played an instrumental role in protecting the area from being mined for molybdenum.  Merriam Peak is located in the middle of the range just north of Castle Peak, the highest point in the range. The peak is located in the White Clouds roadless area of Sawtooth National Recreation Area.

Merriam Peak is in the watershed of Little Boulder Creek, which is a tributary of the East Fork of the Salmon River. Castle Lake is at the peak's southern base, separating it from Castle Peak. Baker Lake is east of the peak, while Noisy and Quiet lakes are north and west of the peak, respectively.

References

External links 
 Sawtooth National Forest - Official Site

Mountains of Custer County, Idaho
Mountains of Idaho
Sawtooth National Forest